Karlo Butić (born 21 August 1998) is a Croatian professional footballer who plays as a forward for Italian  club Feralpisalò.

Club career

Inter Milan
After making his debut in the Croatian second tier for his hometown club Zadar in the 2015–16 season at the age of 16, he joined Italian club Inter Milan, where he was assigned to the Under-19 team. He won the Campionato Nazionale Primavera with the team. He also was the top scorer of the 2017 Torneo di Viareggio with 6 goals.

Torino
For the 2017–18 season, he joined another Italian club Torino, again being assigned to the Under-19 team. He won the Coppa Italia Primavera with the squad and also became the team's best scorer of the season with 20 goals. He was called up for the main squad on several occasions in March and April 2018 for Serie A games, but did not see any playing time.

Loan to Ternana
On 27 August 2018, he joined Serie C club Ternana on loan for the 2018–19 season. He made his Serie C debut for Ternana on 30 September 2018 in a game against Vis Pesaro as a 70th-minute substitute for Guido Marilungo.

Loan to Arezzo
On 31 January 2019, he was loaned to Arezzo.

Loan to Cesena
On 18 July 2019, Butić joined Serie C side Cesena on loan until 30 June 2020.

Pordenone
On 1 September 2020, he signed a three-year contract with Serie B club Pordenone.

Butić played regularly in his first season, collecting 31 appearances and scoring four goals, one of which helped Pordenone gain a 2-0 home win against Cosenza in the last league fixture, as the club consequently secured his permanence in the second tier. Following his good performances, Butić reached an agreement with Pordenone to extend his contract until 2024.

Loan to Cosenza
On 18 July 2022, Butić moved on loan to Cosenza with a conditional obligation to buy.

Feralpisalò
On 13 January 2023, Butić signed a 2.5-year contract with Feralpisalò.

Career statistics

Club

References

External links
 

1998 births
Living people
Sportspeople from Zadar
Association football forwards
Croatian footballers
NK Zadar players
Torino F.C. players
Ternana Calcio players
S.S. Arezzo players
Cesena F.C. players
Pordenone Calcio players
Cosenza Calcio players
FeralpiSalò players
First Football League (Croatia) players
Serie C players
Serie B players
Croatian expatriate footballers
Expatriate footballers in Italy
Croatian expatriate sportspeople in Italy